Marlene Dumas (born 3 August 1953) is a South African artist and painter currently based in the Netherlands.

Life and work
Dumas was born in 1953 in Cape Town, South Africa and grew up in Kuils River in the Western Cape, where her father had a vineyard. Dumas witnessed the system of Apartheid during her childhood. Dumas began painting in 1973 and showed her political concerns and reflections on her identity as a white woman of Afrikaans descent in South Africa. She studied art at the University of Cape Town from 1972 to 1975, and then at Ateliers '63 in Haarlem, which is now located in Amsterdam. She studied psychology at the University of Amsterdam in 1979 and 1980. She currently lives and works in the Netherlands and is one of the country's most prolific artists. 

Dumas has also featured in some films, Miss Interpreted (1997), Alice Neel (2007), Kentridge and Dumas in Conversation (2009), The Future is Now! (2011), and Screwed (2017). Several books included illustrations by Dumas,- Marlene Dumas: Myths and Mortals, Venus and Adonis, David Zwirner: 25 Years, Marlene Dumas: Against the Wall, Marlene Dumas: Sweet Nothings, Marlene Dumas: The Image as Burden, Marlene Dumas: Measuring Your Own Grave, Experiments with Truth: Gandhi and Images of Violence.

Dumas often uses reference material of polaroid photographs of her friends and lovers, whilst she also references magazines and pornographic material. She also paints portraits of children and erotic scenes to impact the world of contemporary art. She has said that her works are better appreciated as originals since many of her smaller sexual works are very intimate. With many of her paintings she depicts her friends, models, and prominent political figures.

Dumas paintings are seen as portraits but they do not represent people but an emotional state that one could be in. Her art focuses on more serious issues and themes such as sexuality and race, guilt and innocence, violence and tenderness. Dumas style is more older Romanticism tradition. She uses loose brushstrokes to add distortion but also great detail to her art. Dumas likes to use a wet-on-wet technique, that combines thin layers of paint with thick ones. Her media of choice is oil on canvas and ink on paper. Her subjects range from new born babies, models, strippers, and many figures from popular culture.

The sale of Dumas's Jule-die Vrou (1985), positioned Dumas as one of three living female artists to trade for over $1 million.

Dumas taught at the Academie voor Beeldende Vorming (ABV) in Tilburg, Academie voor Kunst en Industrie (AKI) in Enschede, Rijksakademie Van Beeldende Kunsten in Amsterdam, and De Ateliers in Amsterdam (Tutorials and Coaching).

Dumas' work is in the collections of the Museum of Modern Art and Dordrechts Museum. Her work was included in the 2022 exhibition Women Painting Women at the Modern Art Museum of Fort Worth.

Education
Dumas was awarded an honorary degree from the University of Antwerp. She also holds degrees from the University of Cape Town, from Ateliers 63 in Haarlem and the Institute of Psychology, University of Amsterdam.

References

Further reading
 Selma Klein Essink, Marcel Vos and Jan Debbaut, Miss Interpreted, exhibition catalogue, Van Abbemuseum, Eindhoven, 1992
 Jonathan Hutchinson, Chlorosis, exhibition catalogue, The Dougles Hyde Gallery, Dublin, 1994
 Catherine Kinley, Marlene Dumas, exhibition broadsheet, Tate Gallery, London, 1996
 Gianni Romano, Suspect, Skira, Milan, 2003
 Cornelia Butler, Marlene Dumas: painter as witness, Museum of Contemporary Art, Los Angeles, 2008
 Ilaria Bonacossa, Dominic van den Boogerd, Barbara Bloom and Mariuccia Casadio, Marlene Dumas, Phaidon Press, London, 2009
 Neal Benezra and Olga M. Viso, Distemper: Dissonant Themes in the Art of the 1990s. Hirshhorn Museum, Washington, D.C. 1996

External links
Marlene Dumas: Measuring Your Own Grave Exhibition at MoMA

1953 births
Living people
21st-century South African women artists
20th-century South African women artists
21st-century South African painters
20th-century South African painters
21st-century Dutch painters
20th-century Dutch painters
Painters from Amsterdam
Contemporary painters
Dutch women painters
Dutch contemporary artists
Michaelis School of Fine Art alumni
Artists from Cape Town
South African emigrants to the Netherlands
South African women painters
South African contemporary artists
Honorary Members of the Royal Academy
20th-century Dutch women
Neo-expressionist artists